Betta unimaculata , the Howong betta, is a species of labyrinth fish endemic to the island of Borneo where it is only known from the eastern portion of the island.  This species grows to a length of  TL, one of the largest known species of Betta.  This species is also found in the aquarium trade.

References

unimaculata
Fish of Southeast Asia
Taxa named by Canna Maria Louise Popta
Fish described in 1905